Aprica is a town and comune in the province of Sondrio, Lombardy, northern Italy. It is located on the eponymous pass, the most favourable one connecting Valtellina to Val Camonica.

Its main source of income is tourism, using the areas geography to offer skiing (winter) and mountain biking (summer) opportunities.

Twin towns
 Borgo Val di Taro, Italy
 Legnano, Italy

External links
 ApricaOnLine
 Videos of skiing in Aprica
 Pictures of Aprica in winter

Cities and towns in Lombardy
Ski areas and resorts in Italy